The Light of Maternal Instinct (also translated as The Glory of Motherhood) is a 1933 Chinese drama film directed by Bu Wancang, starring Lai Cheuk-Cheuk, Chen Yanyan, and Jin Yan. It is a silent film since it lacks sound for dialogues, but there is background music composed by Ren Guang. One of the songs was composed by Nie Er.

Bu Wancang is also the credited writer, but some scholars believe it was actually Tian Han who wrote the script. Tian Han had secretly joined the Chinese Communist Party in 1932 and was a wanted man by the Nationalist government for his leftist writings.

The film was remade in 1939 by Yueh Feng as Mother and Daughter (雲裳仙子).

Setting
The film is set in both Shanghai and Southeast Asia (Nanyang).

Cast
Lai Cheuk-Cheuk as Huiying
Jin Yan as Jiahu, Huiying's first husband
Chen Yanyan as Shao Mei, Jiahu and Huiying's daughter
Lu Shi as Lin Jimei, Huiying's second husband
Li Junpan as Huang Xiaoshan, a capitalist in Southeast Asia
He Feiguang as Huang Shulin, Huang Xiaoshan's son
Tan Ying as Chen Bili, a dancer from Shanghai
Liu Jiqun as Liu Dakui, clown #1
Han Langen as Han Junhou, clown #2
Yin Xiucen as Yin Weizai, clown #3
Nie Er as dark-skinned man in Southeast Asia

References

External links

Chinese silent films
Films directed by Bu Wancang
Films set in Shanghai
Chinese drama films
1933 drama films
1933 films
Chinese black-and-white films
Silent drama films